Michael Lamont Reid (born May 4, 1982) is a former gridiron football cornerback. He was signed by the Arizona Cardinals as an undrafted free agent in 2005. He played college football at North Carolina State.

Reid was also a member of the New York Jets and Denver Broncos.

External links
Just Sports Stats
Denver Broncos bio
Hamilton Tiger-Cats bio

1982 births
Living people
American football cornerbacks
American players of Canadian football
NC State Wolfpack football players
Arizona Cardinals players
New York Jets players
Denver Broncos players
Hamilton Tiger-Cats players
Wichita Wild players
People from Concord, North Carolina